Lake Pihlajavesi may refer to following places in Finland:

Pihlajavesi (Saimaa), a major lake basin in Saimaa
Pihlajavesi (Keuruu), a lake in Pihlajavesi, Keuruu

See also
Pihlajavesi (disambiguation)